Lundsjön–Dammsjön is a lake in Stockholm County, Södermanland, Sweden.

Lakes of Stockholm County